Joe Paul Ethridge (April 15, 1928 – December 16, 2007) was a player in the National Football League.

Biography
Ethridge was born in Conway, Texas. Ethridge was drafted by the Green Bay Packers in the sixth round of the 1949 NFL Draft and played that season as an End with the team. He played at the collegiate level at Southern Methodist University.

See also
 List of Green Bay Packers players

References

External links
  

1928 births
2007 deaths
People from Carson County, Texas
Players of American football from Texas
American football tight ends
SMU Mustangs football players
Green Bay Packers players